The 2016 season for the  cycling team began in January at the Tour de San Luis. As a UCI WorldTeam, they were automatically invited and obligated to send a squad to every event in the UCI World Tour.

Team roster

Riders who joined the team for the 2016 season

Riders who left the team during or after the 2015 season

Season victories

Footnotes

References

AG2R La Mondiale
AG2R Citroën Team
2016 in French sport